Luís Hemir Silva Semedo (born 11 August 2003) is a Portuguese professional footballer who plays for Benfica B.

Club career 
Semedo played all of its youth football at Benfica in Lisbon, signing an apprentice contract with the club in 2018, as an under-17.

Having made his way through the club's under-18 and under-19 during the following season—with an average of more than one goal per game—the young footballer signed his first professional contract with As Águias in August 2020.

Having started to play with Benfica's under-23 in the  midway through the 2020–21 season,  he became a regular starter and scorer with the team during the following one.

At that time he was also playing a major role in the Youth League, where the Benfica under-19 topped their group against Dynamo Kyiv, Barcelona and Bayern Munich, scoring a goal against the latter during a 2–0 away win in November 2021 and most notably during their last pool game, a 1–0 home win against the Ukrainian that earned them the top spot.

While having made his first trainings under first team coach Jorge Jesus, Semedo made his professional debut for Benfica B on the 23 January 2022, replacing Duk during a Liga Portugal 2 home win against Penafiel.

Semedo scored the winning goal for Benfica at the 2022 Under-20 Intercontinental Cup.

International career 
Born in Portugal, Semedo is of Cape Verdean descent. He was selected with Portugal under-16 during the 2019–20 season, he later played with the under-19 in September 2021.

Honours
Benfica
 UEFA Youth League: 2021–22
Under-20 Intercontinental Cup: 2022

References

External links

2003 births
Living people
Footballers from Lisbon
Portuguese footballers
Portugal youth international footballers
Portuguese people of Cape Verdean descent
Association football forwards
S.L. Benfica B players
Liga Portugal 2 players